The 8th National Assembly of the Federal Republic of Nigeria was a bicameral legislature inaugurated on 9 June 2015 and ran its course until 9 June 2019.

Composition
The assembly comprises the Senate and the House of Representatives.
The National Assembly comprises 469 members elected across the 6 geopolitical zones of Nigeria. The House of Representative consists of 360 members and the Senate, a total of 109 members from which 59 were elected on the platform of the APC and 49 were elected on the platform of People's Democratic Party following the sudden death of Senator Ahmed Zanna elected on the platform of PDP to represent Borno Central.

Only six of the senators were women. The women elected were Stella Oduah and Uche Ekwunife who both represent Anambra, Monsurat Sunmonu from Oyo state, Fatimat Raji Rasaki, Rose Okoji Oko, Oluremi Tinubu and Binta Garba.

Parliamentary elections
The Parliamentary elections was conducted at the National Assembly Complex, Abuja, the federal capital territory, Nigeria.

Senatorial election
The Assembly was inaugurated on 9 June 2015 at around 10.am following the reading of the proclamation letter of General Muhammadu Buhari, the President of Nigeria, who ordered the inauguration of the Assembly. The letter was read by Alhaji Salisu Maikasuwa, the Clerk of the National Assembly. Out of the 59 Senators-elect, only 57 were in attendance, in line with the Senate Rule that stipulated that only two-thirds of the total Senators need to be present to form a quorum. Senator Bukola Saraki was nominated as candidate for the office of President of the Senate by Senator Ahmad Sani Yerima representing Zamfara Central and his nomination was seconded by Senator Dino Melaye representing Kogi West. The clerk called for further nomination but the other aspirant for the office, Senator Ahmed Ibrahim Lawan, representing Yobe North was absent and the clerk asked twice, if there is any other nomination before he drew the curtain to declare Senator Bukola Saraki winner and Senate President-elect of the Federal Republic of Nigeria. He was led to the platform to take the oaths of office and allegiance led by the clerk. Saraki assumed the offics immediately and took his seat as the Senate president, while the Assembly proceedings continued. Senator Ike Ekweremadu, the Deputy Senate president of the 6th and 7th Assemblies was re-elected following his nomination by Senator George Thompson Sekibo. Senator Ekweremadu polled a total votes of 54 to defeat Senator Mohammed Ali Ndume, who polled only 20 votes.

House of representatives election
The election of the leadership of House of representatives was also conducted by the clerk. After two hours of voting process, Honorable Yakubu Dogara emerged as the Speaker of the Nigerian House of Representatives by 8 votes having  polled 182 votes with 1 vote above the simple majority stipulated by the 1999 Constitution as mended, against honorable Femi Gbajabiamila who polled 174 votes and two ballots were voided.
Dogara was sworn in by the clerk, Alhaji Maikasuwa and he assumed office as Speaker of the Nigerian House of Representatives at around 4.45 pm.

Members

Senate

Abia
Enyinnaya Abaribe (Abia South)
Mao Ohuabunwa (Abia North)
Theodore Orji (Abia Central)

Adamawa
Abdul Aziz Murtala Nyako (Adamawa Central)
Ahmadu Abubakar (Adamawa South)
Binta Masi Garba (Adamawa North)

Akwa-Ibom
Bassey Albert (A/Ibom North East)
Godswill Akpabio (Akwa/Ibom West)
Nelson Effiong (A/Ibom South)

Anambra
Andy Uba (Anambra South)
Stella Oduah (Anambra North)
Victor Umeh (Anambra Central)

Vacant (Bauchi South)
Isah Hamma Misau(Bauchi Central)
Suleiman Nazif (Bauchi North)

Bayelsa
Ben Murray-Bruce (Bayelsa East)
Emmanuel Paulker (Bayelsa Central)
Ogola Foster (Bayelsa West)

Benue
Akume George (Benue West)
Barnabas Gemade (Benue East)
David Mark (Benue South)

Borno
Abubakar Kyari (Borno North)
Ahmad Zannah (Borno Central)
Ali Ndume (Borno South)

Cross River
Rose Okoji Oko ( Cross River North)
Gershom Bassey (C/River South)
John Enoh (Cross River Central)

Delta
Alfred Joseph (Delta Central)
James Manager (Delta South)
Peter Nwaboshi (Delta North)

Ebonyi
Ogba Joseph (Ebonyi Central)
Samuel Egwu (Ebonyi North)
Sunday Oji (Ebonyi South)

Edo
Clifford Ordia (Edo Central)
Francis Alimekhena (Edo North)
Mathew Urhoghide (Edo South)

Ekiti
Biodun Olujimi (Ekiti South)
Duro Faseyi (Ekiti North)
Fatimat Raji-rasaki (Ekiti Central)

Enugu
Gilbert Nnaji (Enugu East)
Ike Ekweremadu (Enugu West)
Utazi Chukwuka (Enugu North)

FCT
Philips Aduda (FCT)

Gombe
Bayero Nafada (Gombe North)
Goje Danjuma (Gombe Central)
Joshua Lidani (Gombe South)

Imo
Benjamin Uwajumogu (Imo North)
Samuel Anyanwu (Imo East)
Uzodinma Goodhope (Imo West)

Jigawa
Abdullahi Abubakar Gumel (Jigawa N/West)
Muhammad Shitu (Jigawa N/East)
Sabo Mohammed (Jigawa S/West)

Kaduna
Danjuma La'ah (Kaduna South)
Mallam Shehu Sani, (Kaduna Central)
Uthman Hunkuyi (Kaduna North)

Kano
Jibrin I Barau (Kano North)
Kabiru Gaya (Kano South)
Rabiu Kwankwaso (Kano Central)

Katsina
Abu Ibrahim (Katsina South)
Mustapha Bukar(Katsina North)
Kurfi Umaru (Katsina Central)

Kebbi
Adamu Aliero (Kebbi Central)
Bala Ibn Na'allah (Kebbi South)
Yahaya Abdullahi (Kebbi North)

Kogi
Abdulrahman Abubakar (Kogi East)
Ahmed Ogembe (Kogi Central)
Dino Melaye (Kogi West)

Kwara
Bukola Saraki (Kwara Central)
Rafiu Ibrahim (Kwara South)
Shaába Lafiagi (Kwara North)

Lagos
Solomon Olamilekan Adeola (Lagos West)
Gbenga Bareehu Ashafa (Lagos East)
Oluremi Tinubu (Lagos Central)

Nasarawa
Abdullahi Adamu (Nasarawa West)
Philip Aruwa Gyunka (Nasarawa North)
Suleman Asonya Adokwe (Nasarawa South)

Niger
Aliyu Sabi Abdullahi ( Niger North)
David Umaru (Niger East)
Sani Mohammed (Niger South)

Ogun
Buruju Kashamu (Ogun East)
Joseph Dada (Ogun West)
Prince Lanre Tejuosho (Ogun Central)

Ondo
Robert Ajayi Boroffice (Ondo North)
Tayo Alasoadura (Ondo Central)
Yele Omogunwa (Ondo South)

Osun
Babajide Omoworare (Osun East)
Isiaka Adeleke (Osun West)
Olusola Adeyeye (Osun Central)

Oyo
Buhari Abdulfatai (Oyo North)
Adesoji Akanbi (Oyo South)
Monsurat Sunmonu (Oyo Central)

Plateau
Jang Jonah (Plateau North)
Jeremiah Useni (Plateau South)
Joshua Dariye (Plateau Central)

Rivers
George Sekibo (Rivers East)
Olaka Nwogu (Rivers S/East)
Osinakachukwu Ideozu (Rivers West)

Sokoto
Aliyu Wamakko (Sokoto North)
Ibrahim Abdullahi (Sokoto South)
Ibrahim Gobir (Sokoto East)

Taraba
Abubakar Sani Danladi (Taraba North)
Emmanuel Bwacha (Taraba South)
Yusuf Abubakar Yusuf (Taraba Central)

Yobe
Ahmad Lawan (Yobe North)
Bukar Baba Ibrahim (Yobe East)
Mohammed Hasan (Yobe South)

Zamfara
Ahmad Rufai Sani (Zamfara West)
Kabir Garba Marafa (Zamfara Central)
Tijjani Yahaya Kaura (Zamfara North)

References

External links 
 Official website of the Nigerian National Assembly 
 Assemblyonline news on the National Assembly
 Official People and Legislature Information Interchange

Politics of Nigeria
8th
Nigeria
2015 in Nigerian politics